Kirk Bryan may refer to:

Kirk Bryan (geologist) (1888–1950), American geologist
Kirk Bryan (oceanographer) (born 1929), American oceanographer

See also
Brian Kirk (born 1968), Irish television director

eo:Kirk Bryan